The Schembart Carnival or Nuremberg Shrovetide Carnival was popular in Nuremberg, Germany in the 15th century before it ended in 1539 due to the complaints of a town dignitary. The carnival featured costumed men with bearded masks carved of wood, carrying on and generally acting foolishly. The name shembart is German for 'maskbeard'. Along with music, song, food and drink, the carnival featured speakers who poked fun at politicians, persons of power, and policies of the government. The carnival was revived in 1974.

We know details about the Schembart Carnival from about more than 80 Schembartbooks (Schembartbuch, maskbeardbooks). These manuscripts describe chronologically and richly illustrate the Nuremberg Schembartlauf events of 1449 to 1530. Written from the late 16th century until the 19th century, these books are quite similar to each other and mostly have colored drawings of the costumed men and of festivities of each year, and also list the names of participants, descriptions of masks, and a recording of the better carnival events. 35 originals are located in Nuremberg libraries, most of them in the Germanisches Nationalmuseum Nuremberg, and about 30 more are in other German cities. Some books reside abroad.

Since the 17th century sporadic performances are reported, but only starting in 1974, the Nuremberg "Schembart Gesellschaft" performs the event regularly, although not every year.

See also
Fastnacht
Fastnacht (Pennsylvania Dutch)
Carnival in Germany, Switzerland and Austria

References

External links

Rosenwald Collection
Carnival Traditions in Different Regions
Images of Costumes from the Schembartbuch
Website Schembart Gesellschaft Nürnberg

Nuremberg
Carnivals in Germany

de:Schembartlauf